The 2014-15 Kuwaiti Premier League season was the 53rd season of the Kuwait Premier League, Kuwait's highest football league. The season saw 14 teams compete, with Kuwait SC being crowned as champions with an undefeated 20-6-0 record. Patrick Fabiano led the league with 22 goals.

As the top two teams, Kuwait SC and Al-Arabi SC both qualified for the 2016 Asian Football Confederation (AFC) Cup, an international association football competition between domestic Asian clubs. However, the teams were unable to participate due to the Kuwait Football Association's suspension by FIFA on 16 October 2015. The ban was not lifted until 6 December 2017.

Standings

References

 

Kuwait Premier League seasons
Kuwaiti Premier League
1